Abirus is a genus of leaf beetles in the subfamily Eumolpinae. It is distributed from the Malay Archipelago to the Indian subcontinent, China, and the Ryukyu Islands. The genus was first established by the Belgian entomologist Félicien Chapuis in 1874, as a split of Dermorhytis.

Species
The following species are placed in the genus:

 Abirus aeneus (Wiedemann, 1821)
 Abirus andamansis Lefèvre, 1891
 Abirus angustatus Lefèvre, 1887
 Abirus apicalis (Baly, 1867)
 Abirus balyi Medvedev, 2019
 Abirus ceylonicus Jacoby, 1908
 Abirus coerulea (Jacoby, 1877)
 Abirus elegans (Baly, 1864)
 Abirus elongatus Jacoby, 1908
 Abirus flavopilosus Jacoby, 1884
 Abirus fortunei (Baly, 1861)
 Abirus globicollis Lefèvre, 1890
 Abirus hageni Lefèvre, 1887
 Abirus igneicollis Jacoby, 1908
 Abirus laticornis Tan, 1982
 Abirus philippinensis (Baly, 1867)
 Abirus piceipes (Baly, 1867)
 Abirus puberulus Lefèvre, 1876
 Abirus rubripes Lefèvre, 1885
 Abirus speciosus Jacoby, 1895
 Abirus subrugosus Jacoby, 1884
 Abirus tuberculipennis Lefèvre, 1885
 Abirus vaksovi Medvedev & Romantsov, 2014
 Abirus violaceus Jacoby, 1884
 Abirus xishuangensis Tan, 1982

Synonyms:
 Abirus denticollis Lefèvre, 1893: synonym of Abirus fortunei (Baly, 1861)
 Abirus granosus Lefèvre, 1893: synonym of Abirus fortunei (Baly, 1861)
 Abirus harmandi Lefèvre, 1876: synonym of Abirus fortunei (Baly, 1861)
 Abirus kiotoensis Pic, 1944: synonym of Abirus fortunei (Baly, 1861)
 Abirus yashiroi Yuasa, 1930: synonym of Abirus fortunei (Baly, 1861)

References

Eumolpinae
Chrysomelidae genera
Taxa named by Félicien Chapuis
Beetles of Asia